Leonhardstein is a mountain of Bavaria, Germany, near Kreuth.

References

Mountains of Bavaria
Mountains of the Alps